Brisbane Continental Cycling Team was an Australian UCI Continental team founded in 2018 and disbanded at the end of the same year.

Major results
2018
Stage 5 New Zealand Cycle Classic, Jordan Kerby

Team roster

References

UCI Continental Teams (Oceania)
Cycling teams based in Australia
Cycling teams established in 2018
Cycling teams disestablished in 2018
Defunct cycling teams based in Australia